Bulevardi (Boulevard) is a boulevard in Helsinki, Finland. It starts at Erottaja and ends at Hietalahdentori. The majority of the boulevard is located in the western part of the Kamppi neighborhood and a small part of Punavuori. Restaurants, cafes, and art galleries line the street. The Alexander Theatre and Sinebrychoff Museum of Art are located on Bulevardi.

Streets in Helsinki
Kamppi
Boulevards in Finland